Phryneta macularis is a species of beetle in the family Cerambycidae. It was described by Harold in 1879. It is known from the Democratic Republic of the Congo and Angola.

References

Phrynetini
Beetles described in 1879